Borivali Assembly constituency is one of the 288 Vidhan Sabha (legislative assembly) constituencies in Maharashtra state in western India. This constituency came into existence in 1951 as one of the 268 Vidhan Sabha constituencies of the erstwhile Bombay state.

Overview
Borivali constituency is one of the 26 Vidhan Sabha constituencies located in the Mumbai Suburban district.

Borivali is part of the Mumbai North Lok Sabha constituency along with five other Vidhan Sabha segments, namely Dahisar, Magathane Kandivali East, Charkop and Malad West in the Mumbai Suburban district.

Members of Legislative Assembly

Election results

Assembly elections 1995

Assembly elections 1999

Assembly elections 2004

Assembly elections 2009

Assembly elections 2014

Assembly elections 2019

See also
 Borivali
 List of constituencies of Maharashtra Vidhan Sabha

References

Assembly constituencies of Mumbai
Politics of Mumbai Suburban district
Borivali
Assembly constituencies of Maharashtra